Junior's is a restaurant chain with the original location in Downtown Brooklyn, New York City, most famous for its cheesecake.

Junior's may also refer to:

Junior's Eyes, British musical group 
Junior's Fashion Week (JFW), a bi-annual runway showcase held in various Indian cities
"Junior's Farm", a song written by Paul and Linda McCartney and performed by Wings
Junior's Grill (1948–2011), a restaurant in Atlanta, Georgia, USA

See also
Junior (disambiguation), including Juniors